Mengenillidae is a family of insects belonging to the order Strepsiptera. It is the second most basal member of the order,  after Bahiaxenidae. Unlike members of Stylopidia, which contains the vast majority of strepsipterans, the adult females of the family are free-living with legs. Members of the family with known hosts (Eoxenos and Mengenilla) parasitise members of the family Lepismatidae (silverfish and kin).

Genera 
After
 Ceanocholax
 Congoxenos Kinzelbach, 1972
 Eoxenos Peyerimhoff, 1919
 Mengenilla Hofeneder, 1910
 Trilineatoxenos de Carvalho, 2007
 Yemengenilla Luna de Carvalho, 1992

References

Strepsiptera